The Voice Israel (Season 1)  is the first season of the reality show The Voice Israel, which focuses on finding the next Israeli pop star. It is hosted by Michael Aloni with Coaches Shlomi Shabat, Sarit Hadad, Aviv Geffen and Rami Kleinstein. Kathleen Reiter was declared the winner, with Raz Shmueli as runner-up.

Summary of competitors

Competitors' table
 – Winner
 – Runner-up
 – 2nd Runner-up
 – Eliminated

Result Tables

The Blind Auditions

Episode 1

Episode 2: January 13, 2012

Episode 3: January 20, 2012

Episode 4: January 28, 2012

Episode 5: February 5, 2012

Episode 6

Episode 7

Episodes 8–11: Battle Rounds 
 – Battle Winner

Episode 12

The Sing-off

Live Shows

Episodes 13-14: Top 24

Each coach remain with six artists at this stage. Each coach in his/her turn chose threesome from that team, the after their performances, the artist that received the most public votes advanced to the next stage automatically and the coach chose betweet the two remaining artist who will advance and who will eliminate from the competition.

Colour key:

Episode 13

Episode 14

Episodes 15-16: Top 16

At this stage, each team remains with four artists. after their performances, two artist that received the most public votes advanced to the next stage automatically and the coach chose betweet the two remaining artist who will advance and who will eliminate from the competition.

Colour key:

Episode 15
Group performances: Sarit Team with Sarit Hadad ("מרוץ החיים"); Aviv Team with Aviv Geffen ("השיר שלנו").

Episode 16
Group performances: Shlomi Team with Shlomi Shabat ("תנו לגדול בשקט"); Rami Team with Rami Kleinstein ("עניין של זמן").

Episode 17: Top 12 - Quarter finals

At this stage, each team remains with four artists. after their performances, the artist that received the most public votes advanced to the Semi finals automatically and the coach chose betweet the two remaining artist who will advance and who will eliminate from the competition.

Colour key:

Episode 18: Top 8 - Semi finals

At this stage, the coaches will have a 50/50 say with the audience and the public in deciding which artists move on to the Final.

Colour key:

Episode 19: Before the Final

Episode before the Final.

Episode 20: Top 4 - The Final
Group performance: Top 24  contestants exclude the finalists ("תתארו לכם");

Round 1

Round 2 - Duets with the coaches

Round 3 - The Original Song

Episode 21: Most Loveable Performances

References

External links
 The Voice Israel Official website

The Voice Israel seasons
2012 Israeli television seasons